Mount Persis is a 5,464 ft summit located in Snohomish County, of Washington state. The mountain is part of the Cascade Range and is situated in the Mount Baker-Snoqualmie National Forest. The mountain was named for Persis Gunn, the wife of homesteader/miner Amos Gunn who started the nearby town of Index, Washington, and also named nearby Mount Index. Precipitation runoff from the mountain drains into tributaries of the Skykomish River.

Climate

Mount Persis is located in the marine west coast climate zone of western North America. Most weather fronts originate in the Pacific Ocean, and travel northeast toward the Cascade Mountains. As fronts approach the North Cascades, they are forced upward by the peaks of the Cascade Range (Orographic lift), causing them to drop their moisture in the form of rain or snowfall onto the Cascades. As a result, the west side of the North Cascades experiences high precipitation, especially during the winter months in the form of snowfall. Due to its temperate climate and proximity to the Pacific Ocean, areas west of the Cascade Crest very rarely experience temperatures below  or above . During winter months, weather is usually cloudy, but, due to high pressure systems over the Pacific Ocean that intensify during summer months, there is often little or no cloud cover during the summer. Because of maritime influence, snow tends to be wet and heavy, resulting in high avalanche danger.

See also
 Gunn Peak

References

External links
 Mount Persis weather: Mountain Forecast

Mountains of Washington (state)
North Cascades
Mountains of Snohomish County, Washington
Mount Baker-Snoqualmie National Forest
North American 1000 m summits